Bayfront Health Punta Gorda, formerly known as Charlotte Regional Medical Center, is a 208 bed for-profit hospital in Punta Gorda, Florida, operated by Community Health Systems. It was the first hospital in Charlotte County, and the hospital first opened its doors on August 17, 1947 as Charlotte Hospital. The hospital is mostly known for its cardiology and neurology services. Charlotte Regional Medical Center saw the most damage from Hurricane Charley out of the three hospitals in Charlotte County; damage from the hurricane temporarily disabled all services at the facility. Riverside Behavioral Center is part of Bayfront Health Punta Gorda.

References

External links 
 official website

Hospital buildings completed in 1947
Buildings and structures in Charlotte County, Florida
Hospitals in Florida
1947 establishments in Florida
Community Health Systems